Associazione Polisportiva Dilettantistica Leonfortese is an Italian association football club, based in Leonforte, Sicily. The club was first founded in 1967, and currently plays in Eccellenza.

History
In 2014, the club was promoted in Serie D for the first time in its history after being crowned Eccellenza Sicily champions by the end of the 2013–14 season. They played a total two seasons at the Serie D level, being relegated at the end of the 2015–16 Serie D campaign following a 0–1 relegation playoff loss to Gelbison. The club was successively excluded from Eccellenza and had to restart from Prima Categoria, returning to play Eccellenza only in 2022.

References

External links 
 Official homepage

Football clubs in Italy
Football clubs in Sicily
Association football clubs established in 1967
Italian football clubs established in 1967